John Jack Kraft (February 10, 1921 – August 28, 2014) was an American basketball coach who coached Villanova for 12 years, from 1961 through 1973. He compiled a 238–95 record (.715). Kraft led Villanova to the NCAA Tournament six times, and five times to the NIT. Only once did Kraft's teams fail to earn a post-season bid, in his final season of 1973. The 1971 team, led by Howard Porter, reached the NCAA Championship game, and lost to UCLA at the height of the UCLA dynasty. However, that appearance was subsequently erased from the books after Porter was retroactively declared ineligible for signing a professional contract midway through his senior year.

Notable players who played for Jack Kraft at Villanova include Chris Ford, Tom Ingelsby, Wali Jones, Bill Melchionni, Howard Porter, Hank Simeontkowski, Jim Washington, and Hubie White.

Kraft died on August 28, 2014, at the age of 93 in Cape May County, New Jersey. In honor of his memory, the Villanova basketball players wore a JK decal on their uniforms for the 2014–15 season.

Head coaching record

* NCAA Tournament appearance and standing as tournament runner-up vacated after Howard Porter was ruled ineligible. Official record for 1970-71 is 23–6.
& Record at Villanova is 238–95, and overall record is 341–183, without vacated games.

See also
 List of NCAA Division I Men's Final Four appearances by coach

References

1921 births
2014 deaths
American men's basketball coaches
American men's basketball players
Basketball coaches from Pennsylvania
Basketball players from Philadelphia
College men's basketball head coaches in the United States
High school basketball coaches in the United States
Rhode Island Rams men's basketball coaches
Saint Joseph's Hawks men's basketball players
Villanova Wildcats men's basketball coaches